Salman Shahid is a Pakistani film, theatre, television and voice actor.

The son of producer Saleem Shahid and veteran actress Khursheed Shahid, he has worked in Lollywood, Bollywood as well as in theatre and television.

He has appeared in the Pakistani television (PTV) TV programme Such Gup (1975) and the TV shows Taal Matol (1975), Teen Bata Teen and Ho Bahoo.

He successfully completed his film studies at the prestigious Moscow Film School. Salman, on his return to Pakistan, did pioneering work to help establish various drama groups and a drama school. His series Ababeel (PTV), Lahore) and Seerhian (PTV, Karachi) were memorable. He also did several noteworthy Individual Plays as well as direct episodes for the successful TV comedy series ‘Family Front’ which was also aired on PTV in 1997. He wrote, directed and acted in the serial ‘Bano Ko Pehchano’ (GEO TV) for which he received Nominations in all departments of his endeavour at the 2006 Lux Style Awards. More recently, Salman has acted in films in India. He played the principal protagonist in ‘Kabul Express’ and a major support in ‘Ishqiya’. Both films have run the international festival circuit.

Filmography

Films
 Khamosh Pani (2004)
 Kabul Express (2006), as Imran Khan Afridi / Subedaar Major Jaan Mohammed
 Ishqiya (2010)
 Dedh Ishqiya (2014)
 Tamanna (2014)
 Na Maloom Afraad (2014) as Gogi Teri Meri Love Story (2016) as Rana Saheb
 3 Bahadur: The Revenge of Baba Balaam as Baba Balaam (2016)
 Azad (2017)Altered Skin (2018) as Imtiaz
 Kaaf Kangana'' (2018)

Television

Awards and nominations
In 1976, Pakistan National Council of the Arts (PNCA) gave him a scholarship to study film-making in Moscow for four years.

References

External links
 

Pakistani male television actors
Pakistani male film actors
Living people
Pakistani male stage actors
Pakistani male comedians
21st-century Pakistani male actors
Male actors from Karachi
1948 births